Institut Pendidikan Guru Kampus Pendidikan Teknik is a teacher's education institute that prepares teacher to their jobs. It is one of the branch of Insititut Pendidikan Guru under the Ministry of Education in Malaysia.

Universities and colleges in Kuala Lumpur
Education schools in Malaysia
Educational institutions established in 1962
1962 establishments in Malaya